Jim Lawrence is a former member of the New Hampshire House of Representatives and a graduate of the U.S. Air Force Academy.

Lawrence served three terms in the New Hampshire House. He owns a consulting firm based in Nashua, New Hampshire. He unsuccessfully ran for this seat again in the 2016 elections as the Republican nominee competing against incumbent Democrat Ann McLane Kuster. If elected, he would have been the first black member of Congress from New Hampshire.

References

Living people
Republican Party members of the New Hampshire House of Representatives
Year of birth missing (living people)
Place of birth missing (living people)
African-American state legislators in New Hampshire
Politicians from Nashua, New Hampshire
21st-century African-American people